Mehtar Davud (died September 1662) was a high-ranking Safavid court eunuch of Georgian origin, who served as the chamberlain (hence his title, mehtar) during the reign of the kings Safi (1629-1642) and Abbas II (1642-1666).

Davud was one of the most influential and important eunuchs at the time. In the past, he had served as a qurchi-e tarkesh and was a gholam-e khasseh and rish-sefid-e haram. His brother Evaz Beg served as a government official, while his other brother, Mohammad Beg, was also a eunuch, and served as imperial treasurer. An important factor in the explanation for the family's renowned position was Davud's own prominent position at the court, which allowed him to safeguard and exercise influence on behalf of the rest of the family.

References

Sources
 
 
 

1662 deaths
Iranian eunuchs
Iranian people of Georgian descent
Safavid chamberlains
Safavid ghilman
17th-century slaves
Safavid slaves